Chukhsa was an ancient area of Pakistan, probably modern Chach, west of the city of Taxila.

History

The area is mentioned in various epigraphic material, such as the Taxila copper plate inscription, where it is described as a territory of the Indo-Scythian ruler Liaka Kusulaka.

The Battle of Chach was fought in 1008 AD between the Ghaznavid army of Sultan Mahmud of Ghazni and the Hindu Shahi army of Anandapala, resulting in the latter's defeat.

References

Regions of Pakistan
Historical regions of Pakistan